The Kingdom of Kurdistan was a short-lived Kurdish state proclaimed in the city of Sulaymaniyah following the collapse of the Ottoman Empire. It lasted from September 1921 until July 1925. Officially, the territory involved was under the jurisdiction of the British Mandate of Mesopotamia.

Sheikh Mahmud revolts 

During the collapse of the Ottoman Empire, Kurds attempted to establish an independent state.

Mahmud Barzanji, the Shaykh of the Qadiriyyah order of Sufis, the most influential personality in Southern Kurdistan, was appointed governor of the former sanjak of Duhok, but rallied against the British and declared an independent Kurdistan in May 1919. He was defeated in June.

On 10 October 1921, a statement was issued in Suleymanyah, the capital of Kurdistan, to establish a Kurdish government. Sheikh Mahmud Barzanji declared himself as the King of the Kingdom of Kurdistan.

After the Treaty of Sèvres, which settled some territories, Sulaymaniya still remained under the direct control of the British High Commissioner. After the subsequent penetration of the Turkish "Özdemir" Detachment into the area, an attempt was made by the British to counter this by appointing Shaykh Mahmud governor again, in September 1922. The Shaykh revolted again, and in November declared himself King of the Kingdom of Kurdistan. Members of his cabinet included:<ref>[http://www.kurdmedia.com/article.aspx?id=11980 Fatah, R. (2006) The Kurdish resistance to Southern Kurdistan annexing with Iraq] </ref>

Shaikh Qadir Hafeed – Prime Minister
Abdulkarim Alaka, a Christian Kurd – Finance Minister
Ahmed Bagy Fatah Bag – Customs Minister
Hajy Mala Saeed Karkukli – Justice Minister
Hema Abdullah Agha – Labour Minister
Mustafa Pasha Yamolki – Education Minister
Shekh Mohammed Gharib – Interior Minister
Zaky Sahibqran – Defence Minister of the Kurdish National Army

Barzanji was defeated by the British in July 1924, and in January 1926 the League of Nations gave the mandate over the territory back to Iraq, with the provision for special rights for Kurds. In 1930–1931, Shaykh Makhmud Barzanji made his last unsuccessful attempt.

The British Royal Air Force's Iraq Command acting on behalf of the Iraqi government in Baghdad played a part in bringing the Kingdom of Kurdistan to an end.

 See also 
 List of Kurdish dynasties and countries
 Republic of Ararat
 Republic of Mahabad
 Kurdistan Regional Government

 References 

Footnotes

General

 McDowell, D. (1996) A Modern History of the Kurds'', pp. 155–163, 194-196

External links 
 The Kingdom of Kurdistan
 Footnotes to History (Kurdistan, Kingdom of)
 Sheik Mahmmud Barzanji

 
Former Kurdish states in Iraq
History of Sulaymaniyah Governorate
1920s in Iraq
Kurdistan, Kingdom of
Kurdistan, Kingdom of
Kurdish separatism in Iraq
Sulaymaniyah
Turkish War of Independence
States and territories established in 1922
States and territories disestablished in 1924
1922 establishments in Iraq
1924 disestablishments in Iraq
20th century in Iraq
Former countries of the interwar period
History of the Kurdish people